Tiferet Israel Congregation is a Sephardic synagogue in Toronto, Ontario, Canada on Sheppard Avenue West in the former city of North York.

Tiferet Israel Congregation follows Moroccan Jewish tradition and is an Orthodox synagogue. Regular services are held during the week, on Shabbat, and on Jewish holidays. The synagogue contains a sanctuary on the main floor with separate seating for men and for women, and in the basement there is a kitchen and a room for luncheons, festive meals, and parties.

History 
 November 24, 1978 - The lot at 756 Sheppard Avenue West was purchased. 
 May 1988 - Groundbreaking Ceremony
 September 5, 1988 - Inauguration Ceremony

References

Moroccan Canadian
Orthodox synagogues in Canada
Sephardi Jewish culture in Canada
Sephardi synagogues
Synagogues in Toronto
1988 establishments in Ontario